La Vallée-de-l'Or (The Golden Valley) is a regional county municipality in the Abitibi-Témiscamingue region in Northwestern Quebec, Canada. The seat is in Val-d'Or. It is named for its gold deposits in the Harricana River and Bell River valleys.

Before October 11, 2003, it was known simply as Vallée-de-l'Or Regional County Municipality.

Subdivisions
There are 10 subdivisions within the RCM:

Cities & Towns (3)
 Malartic
 Senneterre
 Val-d'Or

Municipalities (2)
 Belcourt
 Rivière-Héva

Parishes (1)
 Senneterre

Unorganized Territory (4)
 Lac-Granet
 Lac-Metei
 Matchi-Manitou
 Réservoir-Dozois

Indian Settlement or Reserve (2)
 Kitcisakik
 Lac-Simon

Demographics

Population

Language

Transportation

Access Routes
Highways and numbered routes that run through the municipality, including external routes that start or finish at the county border:

 Autoroutes
 None

 Principal Highways
 
 
 
 

 Secondary Highways
 
 

 External Routes
 None

See also
 List of regional county municipalities and equivalent territories in Quebec

References

 
Regional county municipalities in Abitibi-Témiscamingue
Census divisions of Quebec
Val-d'Or